Sabu also called Tjety was the High Priest of Ptah in the Sixth Dynasty of Ancient Egypt, around 2300 BC. Sabu is mainly known from the remains of his mastaba in Saqqara (E.3). The inscriptions on the fragment of a false door were copied in the 19th century and present part of a biography. The fragments are today in the Egyptian Museum in Cairo. Sabu bears several titles including: Greatest of the Directors of the Craftsmen in the two houses ( - this is the title held by the High Priest of Ptah), chief lector priest, sole friend and count.

The text mentions that before Sabu was made High Priest of god Ptah there were always two men holding this position. Sabu was the first man to hold the position solely. His chronological position within the Sixth Dynasty is uncertain.

References

Memphis High Priests of Ptah
People of the Sixth Dynasty of Egypt